The Blank Theory was a five-piece rock group from Chicago, Illinois.

History
They self-released two albums, Blinding Process in 1998 and Catalyst in 2000. Catalyst included the track "Nevermind" which was featured in a segment of MTV Road Rules. While the first two independent releases were hard edged indie rock, they moved more toward metal when writing for the third release. Upon signing to New Line Records, they teamed up with Adam Schlesinger (Ivy, Fountains of Wayne) and James Iha (The Smashing Pumpkins, A Perfect Circle) for production of Beyond the Calm of the Corridor. The Blank Theory released Beyond the Calm of the Corridor on September 24, 2002, via independent label, New Line Records.

Their cover of Portishead's "Sour Times" was one of two singles from Beyond the Calm of the Corridor and can be heard in the movie trailer to Wicker Park. The other single titled "Middle of Nowhere" was featured on the Freddy vs. Jason soundtrack and in Final Destination 2. Founding member and guitarist, Michael Foderaro, left the band in May 2003 to pursue other music projects. He was eventually replaced by guitarist Mateo Camargo from the band Reforma. In mid-2004, drummer James Knight and keyboardist Shawn Currie also left the band to pursue other music projects.

Eventually, vocalist Nathan Leone and bassist Matthew Leone, along with two members from Reforma (Dan Torelli and Mateo Camargo) formed Madina Lake.

Personnel 
Nathan Leone – vocals
Michael Foderaro – electric guitar
Matthew Leone – bass
James Knight – drums
Shawn Currie – synthesizers and programmator

Discography

Blinding Process EP (1999) 
 "Faded" – 4:56
 "Anathema" – 3:22
 "Broken Glass" – 6:42
 "A Matter of Time" – 4:46
 "Mourning Life" – 5:34

Catalyst EP (2000) 
 "Corporation" – 3:14
 "Vanish" – 3:19
 "Broken Glass" – 4:20
 "Nevermind" – 3:24
 "Recluse" – 4:08
 "Faded" – 4:21
 "Daylight's New Life" – 6:10
 "The Disparate" – 6:15
 "Fascist" (bonus track) – 3:11

Beyond the Calm of the Corridor (2002) 
 "Middle of Nowhere" – 4:05
 "Addicted" – 3:44
 "Father's Eyes" – 3:09
 "Sour Times" (Portishead cover) – 3:35
 "Killing Me" – 4:05
 "Invisible" – 3:07
 "Broken" – 3:43
 "Thicker" – 3:11
 "Back of My Mind" – 3:30
 "Recluse" – 3:41
 "Corporation" – 3:15
 "Fear of God" – 3:45
 "Martyr" – 5:24
 "Hey Bulldog" (The Beatles cover, bonus track for Japan) – 3:14

"Perfect" single (2004) 
 "Perfect" – 2:41

References

External links 
The Official Blank Theory MySpace site

Musical groups from Chicago
American nu metal musical groups
Musical quintets
Heavy metal musical groups from Illinois
Musical groups established in 1998
1998 establishments in Illinois